The Teide Trophy is a pre-season football tournament organised in Tenerife (Canary Islands. The matches are played at Estadio de Los Cuartos, a historic stadium located in La Orotava, a city in the north of the island.

It has been played annually in August since 1971, and is one of the most prestigious summer tournaments in Spain.

Titles by year

Titles by club

References

Football cup competitions in Spain
Football in the Canary Islands
Spanish football trophies and awards